SM UB-32 was a German Type UB II submarine or U-boat in the German Imperial Navy during World War I. The U-boat was ordered on 22 July 1915 and launched on 4 December 1915. She was commissioned into the German Imperial Navy on 11 April 1916 as SM UB-32.

The submarine sank 22 ships in 16 patrols. She was last heard from on 17 September 1917 and may have been bombed and sunk by Royal Naval Air Service aircraft in the English Channel on 22 September 1917. The wreck was found in the 1980s but only identified as UB-32 in 2021.

Design
A German Type UB II submarine, UB-32 had a displacement of  when at the surface and  while submerged. The submarine was powered by two Benz six-cylinder diesel engines producing a total , two Siemens-Schuckert electric motors producing , and one propeller shaft.

UB-32 was fitted with two  torpedo tubes, four torpedoes, and one  Uk L/30 deck gun. She had a complement of twenty-one crew members and two officers and a 42-second dive time.

Summary of raiding history

Wreck and identification as UB-32
In the 1980s a shipwreck was discovered by the Flemish Hydrographic Service some 50 kilometer from the Belgian shore and was put on the map as B140/225. In 2009 some extensive dives were made and it became clear that it was the remains of a U-boat. The wreck is at a maximum depth of 41 meters and it lies on its port side. The remains extend over a length of about 35 meters, with a width of 5 meters. The highest point is the tower, which rises about 6 meters above the ground. The submarine is intact from the stern to about 2 meters in front of the turret. The bow has been completely destroyed, apparently by a heavy impact, and it appears to have been squashed from above, with the hull split in two lengthwise. At 20 meters from the bow lie two large iron fragments on the port side, pieces of the pressure hull of the submarine, probably from the 2 forward depth rudders. The 2 periscopes have been retracted and it is striking that the heads of the periscopes, with the lid, eyepiece and glass, have cracked open. The tail of the U-boat was partly covered with lost nets and ropes. After they were partially removed, the bronze starboard propeller of the submarine was found on which was the inscription: "B & V, 1150 mm, 660, Projiz Flache 8416, Mangan Bronze, STB Schiffsschr. 6, UB.32". After some digging, the port propeller could also be found. The fact that the submarine has two propellers makes it clear that it is a submarine of type UB-II. 

The damage which is clearly visible on the wreckage confirms that the UB-32 sank by a heavy impact from above. The fact that two hatches were closed and that both periscopes were retracted may indicate that the UB-32 was submerged when hit or diving. The bow with the accommodation for the crew, the torpedo hold and the battery compartments, has been completely disassembled. That damage cannot be due to a mine explosion. Mines usually lead to a blown bow or stern, a crack in the hull or a severe dent on the underside of the hull. With this wreck it is clear that an impact from on top of the submarine has led to the 'squeezed' appearance of the wreck. The top deck seems to have split in half. Relatively large fragments have also been found at a distance from the wreck, such as the sheet-iron pieces of the front depth rudders. All of this points to a major explosion, possibly followed by a second, internal explosion. The force that was developed was so great that it caused the fragments to fling and the two periscope heads to explode. Such a violent explosion can be caused by a depth bomb or aircraft bomb or the impact of a torpedo. This seems to somewhat corroborate the British claims that the submarine was sunk from above by a plane.

Notes

References

Bibliography 

 

1915 ships
Ships built in Hamburg
World War I submarines of Germany
German Type UB II submarines
U-boats commissioned in 1916
Maritime incidents in 1917
U-boats sunk in 1917
U-boats sunk by British aircraft
World War I shipwrecks in the North Sea
Ships lost with all hands
Missing U-boats of World War I